Lars Jorde (22 May 1865 – 25 September 1939) was a Norwegian painter and illustrator.

Biography
He was born at Vang in Hedmark, Norway. He entered the Norwegian National Academy of Craft and Art Industry in 1889. He studied under Gerhard Munthe, Alfred Philippe Roll, Eilif Peterssen and Harriet Backer, and Kristian Zahrtmann. He studied at Paris  and in Italy. In 1905, he moved to Lillehammer and in 1912 to a house that Thorvald Erichsen had had built based upon design by  Arnstein Arneberg. He lived in Lillehammer until his death in  1939.

He provided decorative work  at the Vingrom chapel in Lillehammer (1908), the student hall at the Norwegian College of Agriculture in Ås, and made a series of decorations for Granheim Sanatorium in Follebu (1908–27). In 1925 he decorated Sjøli chapel at Ytre Rendal.
 
He painted in different styles over the course of his career, and is represented with several works in the National Gallery of Norway. Jorde also worked as an illustrator, illustrating Nansen and Sverdrup's Fram over polhavet (1897) and Andersen's I cancelliraadens dage (1907) and I brønden og i tjernet by  Jørgen Moe (1898).

References

1865 births
1939 deaths
People from Hamar
19th-century Norwegian painters
20th-century Norwegian painters
Norwegian illustrators
Norwegian male painters
19th-century Norwegian male artists
20th-century Norwegian male artists